Bettys Diagnose is a German television series that premiered on January 9, 2015 at ZDF.

Plot
In "Bettys Diagnose" Bettina "Betty" Dewald (Bettina Lamprecht), who is as resolute as she is competent, is fighting for her patients and against the hospital apparatus together with her colleague and friend Lizzy (Theresa Underberg). In doing so, she regularly meets Dr. Marco Behring (Maximilian Grill), whom she challenges with her directness. From Season 4, Annina Hellenthal takes on the role of a new "Betty".

See also
List of German television series

References

External links

 

2015 German television series debuts
German-language television shows
ZDF original programming